Burcu Çelik Özkan (born 1 January 1986, Muş) is a former member of the Turkish parliament for the Peoples' Democratic Party (HDP).

Education and professional career 
Burcu Çelik Özkan has a law degree from the Marmara University. After she worked as a lawyer and was involved in the Libertarian Jurists Platform.

Political career 
Özkan was active in the local HDP branch of Beylikdüzü before being elected into parliament. Özkan was elected as an MP for Muş in the general elections in June 2015 and again in the snap elections in November 2015. During her term she was a defender of LGBT rights

Prosecution 
Özkan was arrested in April 2017. She was condemned to 6 years imprisonment in a first trial for "committing crimes on behalf of an illegal organization without being a member", a sentence she appealed. In October 2017 the sentence was overturned and in February 2018 a new trial was ordered to take place. On 10 April 2018, an appeal court in Turkey handed opposition MP Burcu Çelik Özkan a sentence of more than seven years in prison for terrorism propaganda. On the 6 October 2019 the verdict was overruled by the court of cassation and she was subsequently released.

References

External links
Burcu Çelik Özkan TBMM

Turkish dissidents
Turkish people imprisoned on charges of terrorism
21st-century Turkish politicians
Peoples' Democratic Party (Turkey) politicians
1986 births
Living people
Politicians arrested in Turkey
Marmara University alumni